Luiz Lúcio Reis Júnior (born 14 January 2001) is a Brazilian footballer who plays as a goalkeeper for Famalicão.

Club career

Early career
With the name of the game:  Júnior , Júnior Reis started his career in football at the age of 16, one year below that allowed by the competition regulations. He served in Diadema for one season, playing in the São Paulo State Championship under-17 as the starter of the club that faced opponents such as; Santos and Corinthians.

Júnior Reis was loaned by Diadema, to Mirassol Futebol Clube the following year, in 2018 he made good campaigns in the State Championship of São Paulo sub-17 (this time at the age limit, allowed by the regulation). Once again, F.C Famalicão got in touch with Clube Atlético Diadema, to have him definitively through a negotiation to defend the under-21 team at first, then being promoted to the under-23 team before being promoted to the Famalicão professional, as second reserve, first reserve and finally first goalkeeper

Famalicão
Júnior made his professional debut with Famalicão in a 2-0 Primeira Liga loss to F.C. Paços de Ferreira on 27 November 2020.

At the end of the 2020-2021 season the youngster will host 30 appearances in all, as a professional in Liga NOS, the Portuguese First Division

References

External links
 
 

2001 births
Living people
Sportspeople from Piauí
Brazilian footballers
Association football goalkeepers
F.C. Famalicão players
Primeira Liga players
Brazilian expatriate footballers
Brazilian expatriates in Portugal
Expatriate footballers in Portugal